Baldoni is an Italian surname. Notable people with the surname include:
Emily Baldoni (born 1984),  American actor, director, and filmmaker
Enzo Baldoni (1948-2004), Italian journalist killed in Iraq
John Baldoni (born 1954), American-born executive coach and leadership educator
Justin Baldoni (born 1984), American actor

Fictional characters:
Carlo Baldoni, a Highlander character

Italian-language surnames